The Roman Catholic Diocese of Guarapuava is a diocese located in the city of Guarapuava in the Ecclesiastical province of Curitiba in Brazil.

History
 December 16, 1965: Established as Diocese of Guarapuava from the Diocese of Campo Mourão, Diocese of Ponta Grossa and Diocese of Toledo

Bishops
 Bishops of Guarapuava (Roman rite)
 Bishop Friedrich Helmel, S.V.D. (1966.03.19 – 1986.09.27)
 Bishop Albano Bortoletto Cavallin (1986.10.24 – 1992.03.11), appointed Archbishop of Londrina, Parana
 Bishop Giovanni Zerbini, S.D.B. (1995.01.11 – 2003.07.02)
 Bishop Antônio Wagner da Silva, S.C.J. (2003.07.02 – 2020.05.06)
 Bishop Amilton Manoel da Silva, C.P. (2020.05.06 - present)

Coadjutor bishop
Antônio Wagner da Silva, S.C.I. (2000-2003)

References
 GCatholic.org
 Catholic Hierarchy
 Diocese website (Portuguese)

Guarapuava
Roman Catholic dioceses in Brazil
Christian organizations established in 1965
Guarapuava, Roman Catholic Diocese of
Roman Catholic dioceses and prelatures established in the 20th century